John Baird, DL, JP (17 February 1852 – 8 July 1900), was a Scottish Unionist politician.

Biography
Baird was the son of John Baird, 1st of Ury, and his wife Margaret Findlay, and younger brother of Sir Alexander Baird, 1st Baronet, Lord Lieutenant of Kincardineshire from 1889 to 1918.

He was educated at Harrow School and Christ Church, Oxford.

He was Deputy Lieutenant and Justice of the Peace for Inverness-shire.

At the 1885 general election Baird was elected as the Member of Parliament (MP) for North West Lanarkshire. He lost the seat at the 1886 general election to the socialist Robert Cunninghame-Graham, who stood as a Liberal-Labour candidate and became Britain's first socialist MP.

Baird had residences at Knoydart, the Isle of Ornsay and Lochwood, Lanarkshire. He died at the age of 48.

Baird married Constance Amelia Harford, daughter of John Battersby Harford and wife Mary Charlotte de Bunsen, on 23 April 1878 and had two daughters and two sons.

References

External links
 

1852 births
1900 deaths
People educated at Harrow School
Alumni of Christ Church, Oxford
Members of the Parliament of the United Kingdom for Scottish constituencies
Scottish Tory MPs (pre-1912)
UK MPs 1885–1886